KILX (102.1 FM) is a radio station broadcasting a Country music format. Licensed to serve De Queen, Arkansas, United States, the station is currently owned by Jay and Teresa Bunyard, through licensee Bunyard Broadcasting, Inc.

References

External links
 
 FCC History Cards for KILX

Country radio stations in the United States
ILX